The Juno Award for Classical Album of the Year has been awarded since 1977, as recognition each year for the best classical music album in Canada.

Winners

Best Classical Album of the Year (1977–1984)
1977 – Anton Kuerti, Beethoven - Vols. 1,2,& 3
1978 – The Toronto Symphony Orchestra, Three Borodin Symphonies
1979 – Glenn Gould/Roxolana Roslak, Hindemith; Das Marienleben
1980 – Judy Loman/R. Murray Schafer, The Crown of Ariadne
1981 – Arthur Ozolins, Stravinsky - Chopin Ballads
1982 – Orchestre symphonique de Montreal/Charles Dutoit, Ravel: Daphnis Et Chloe (Complete Ballet)
1983 – Glenn Gould, Bach: The Goldberg Variations
1984 – Glenn Gould, Brahms: Ballades Op. 10, Rhapsodies Op. 79

Best Classical Album:  Solo or Chamber Ensemble (1985–2002)
1985 – The Orford String Quartet, W.A. Mozart-String Quartets
1986 – James Campbell (clarinet), Stolen Gems
1987 – The Orford String Quartet, Ofra Harnoy (cello), Schubert, Quintet In C
1989 – Ofra Harnoy, Arpeggione Sonata
1990 – Louis Lortie, 20th Century Original Piano Transcriptions
1991 – The Orford String Quartet, Schafer: Five String Quartets
1992 – Louis Lortie (piano), Liszt: Annees De Pelerinage
1993 – Louis Lortie, Beethoven: Piano Sonatas
1994 – Louis Lortie, Beethoven: Piano Sonatas, Opus 10, No 1-3
1995 – Erica Goodman, Erica Goodman Plays Canadian Harp Music
1996 – Marc-Andre Hamelin (piano), Alkan: Grande Sonate/Sonatine/ Le Festin d'Esope
1997 – Marc-André Hamelin, Scriabin: The Complete Piano Sonatas
1998 – Marc-André Hamelin, Marc-André Hamelin Plays Franz Liszt
1999 – Angela Hewitt, Bach: Well-Tempered Clavier - Book 1
2000 – St. Lawrence String Quartet, Schumann: String Quartets
2001 – James Ehnes, Bach: The Six Sonatas & Partitas for Solo Violin
2002 – Angela Hewitt, Bach Arrangements

Classical Album of the Year: Solo or Chamber Ensemble (2003–2021)
2003 – Marc-André Hamelin, Liszt: Paganini Studies & Schubert March Transcriptions
2004 – Gryphon Trio, Murphy, Chan, Hatzis, Kulesha: Canadian Premieres
2005 – Angela Hewitt, Bach: The English Suites
2006 – Marc-André Hamelin, Albéniz: Iberia
2007 – Jean-Marie Zeitouni/Les Violons du Roy, Piazzolla
2008 – Marc-André Hamelin, Alkan Concerto for Solo Piano
2009 – James Ehnes, Homage
2010 – Joel Quarrington, Joel Quarrington: Garden Scene
2011 – Gryphon Trio, Beethoven: Piano Trios Op. 70 No. 1, Ghost & No. 2: Op 11
2012 – Marc-André Hamelin, Liszt Piano Sonata
2013 – Amici Chamber Ensemble, Levant
2014 – James Ehnes, Prokofiev Complete Works for Violin
2015 – James Ehnes, Bartok: Chamber Works for Violin Vol. 3
2016 – James Ehnes, Franck & Strauss: Violin Sonatas
2017 – New Orford String Quartet, Brahms: String Quartets, Op. 51 NOS. 1 & 2
2018 – Janina Fialkowska, Chopin Recital 3
2019 - Gryphon Trio, The End of Flowers: Works by Clarke & Ravel
2020 - Angela Schwarzkopf, Detach
2021 - Ensemble Made in Canada, Mosaïque

References

Classical Album - Solo or Chamber Ensemble
Classical music awards
Album awards